Hannah Geffert is an American politician serving as a member of the West Virginia Senate from the 16th district. She was appointed in September 2021, succeeding incumbent Democrat John Unger, who retired to become a Berkeley County magistrate. Geffert originally announced she would serve for the remainder of the unexpired term and would not seek reelection for a full term in the 2022 election. However, on March 2, 2022 she reported that she changed her mind and would run for re-election. She cited learning that the position would go unopposed and unfinished business in Charleston as reasons for her decision.

Geffert lives in Martinsburg, West Virginia. Geffert is a retired political science professor who taught at Shepherd University.

References 

Women state legislators in West Virginia
Living people
Year of birth missing (living people)
Democratic Party West Virginia state senators
21st-century American women
Politicians from Martinsburg, West Virginia
Shepherd University faculty
American women political scientists
American political scientists